The 1832 New York gubernatorial election was held from November 5 to 7, 1832, to elect the Governor and Lieutenant Governor of New York.

Candidates
The Democratic Party nominated U.S. senator William L. Marcy. They nominated University of the State of New York regent John Tracy for Lieutenant Governor.

The National Republican Party nominated state assemblyman and 1830 gubernatorial candidate Francis Granger. They nominated Samuel Stevens for Lieutenant Governor.

Results
The Democratic ticket of Marcy and Tracy was elected.

Sources
Result: The Tribune Almanac 1841

1832
New York
Gubernatorial election
November 1832 events